Kalokuokamaile (meaning "downpour/blowing of the maile" in Hawaiian), was a Hawaiian chief and first-born son of Keoua Kalanikupuapaikalaninui and half-brother of Kamehameha the Great who unified the Hawaiian Islands in 1810.  He was the primogenitor of the Royal House of Keoua nui.

Biography
He was born on the island of Maui. His mother was the High Chiefess Kahikikalaokalani ruler of Hana, Kipahulu and Kaupo and possessed the far famed tabu "Ka Poʻo Hoʻolewa i ka La". The tabu signified the laying of the head towards the sun's position in the heavens from its rising unto its setting.  Days of observance of this tabu were strictly kept, the only time for recreation during the tabu must be taken from between the setting of the luminary and the dawn of a new day.  Kalokuokmaile was Keoua's first-born son and was deemed "Ka Keiki o Kona wa Heuole," which means the offspring of his beardless youth. At age three his father return to his ancestral home on the Big Island of Hawaii and left Kalokuokamaile to be raised by his mother.

Years passed and he grew up to be athletic, of good and mild nature, with no selfish or ambitious motives and to take care of his people as the ruler when his mother died.

He had taken a wife from the neighboring district of Kahikinui and Honuaula, ruled over by a chiefly family of which Kaloiokalani was the only daughter.  Tiding of her fine qualities had reached Hana.  He set out to visit that court and by tradition he paid his visits by night.  He was happily received by the parents and soon arrangements for the royal nuptials were completed. When the wedding had taken place and feasting and dancing ended, Kalokuokamaile made preparations to return to Hana.  As Kaloiokalani was a great favorite with her people, the people volunteered to get up a great cavalcade to escort the couple as far as Kipahulu District. Oral history says the procession so large it was mistaken for an invasion.  However Kalokuokamaile was at last settled at the old family homestead and affairs ran smoothly.

They had one child, a daughter named Kaohelelani. She was verging into maidenhood when he died.  His people showed their affection by making his grave on the highest peak, Kauwiki. When news of his death reaching his half-brother Kamehameha I, he decided to take his fatherless niece into his court and for their brother Kealiimaikai to hold Kaohelelani's land inheritances until she reached majority. However, when Kamehameha conquered Kalanikupule, King of Maui, he partitioned the land out to the chiefs who had aided him.

Family tree

References

External links
Biography from the Hawaii Royal Family's official site

Royalty of the Hawaiian Kingdom
House of Kalokuokamaile
Year of birth missing
Year of death missing